Ipso Facto is a studio album by the Canadian rock guitarist Rik Emmett, released in 1992. It was Emmett's second solo studio album.

Track listing
All tracks written by ( Rik Emmett ) unless otherwise noted:

Personnel
 Rik Emmett - Guitars, Synthesizers, Vocals, Drum Programming

Extra Personnel
 Peter Cardinali	–	Bass				( Tracks: 1 - 3, 7, 9, 11 )
 Tom Lewis			–	Bass				( Tracks: 4 - 6, 8, 10 )
 Randy Cooke	-	Drums				( Tracks: 1 - 3, 7, 9, 11 )
 Greg Critchley	–	Drums				( Tracks: 4 - 6, 8, 10 )
 Richard Evans		–	Keyboards			( Tracks: 3 - 10 )
 Ross Munro		–	Tambourine			( Tracks: 2 )
 Brian Leonard		–	Shaker, Energy Coil	( Tracks: 3, 4, 8, 11 )
 Colleen Allen		–	Soprano Saxophone	( Tracks: 4 - 6 )
 Dick Armin		–	Cello				( Tracks: 12 & 13 )
 Pedal Steel		–	Steve Smith			( Tracks: 12 & 13 )

Backing Vocals
 Rik Emmett			( Tracks: 1 & 2 )
 Colleen Allen			( Tracks: 3, 5 - 7, 9, 11 )
 Donna O'Connor		( Tracks: 3, 5, 6, 9, 11 )
 Rebecca Jenkins		( Tracks: 3 & 7 )
 Debbie Fleming		( Tracks: 5, 6, 9, 11 )
 Joanne Powell			( Tracks: 7 )

Production
 Produced By – Rik Emmett, Ross Munro
 Sequence By – Rik Emmett & Andy Hermant
 Recorded At – Manta/Eastern Sound.  Toronto, Ontario, Canada
 Recorded When – June – August 1992
 Recorded By – John Naslen & John Wheels Hurlbut
 Engineered By – Ed Stone & Ron Searles
 Engineered At – Phase One Studios.  Toronto, Ontario, Canada
 Mixed At – McClear Pathé. Toronto, Ontario, Canada
 Mixed By – Damian Korner, Ron Searles, Bill Hermans, Tom Trafalski
 Mastered By – George Marino
 Mastered At – Sterling Sound. NY, NY.

Singles 
"Straight Up/Open-ended Interview Rik Emmett" - Duke DSRDS-9232; released October 8, 1992 (Canada)
"Bang On/Open-ended Interview Rik Emmett" - Duke DSRDS-8121; released October 15, 1992 (Canada)
"Out of the Blue/Meet You There" - Polystar PSDW 3004; released November 12, 1992 (Japan)
"Let Love Conquer All" - Alert Music Inc. DPRO 229; released January 11, 1993 (Canada)
"Out of the Blue (Radio Edit)" - Alert Music Inc. DPRO 234; released January 18, 1993 (Canada)
"Out of the Blue (Radio Edit)" - Duke Street DSRDS-9265; released January 18, 1993 (Canada)

Charts

Album

Singles

Notes

External links 
 Ipso Facto Entry at the Official Rik Emmett Homepage

Rik Emmett albums
1992 albums